Jazmín Elizabeth Mercado de la Cruz (born 1 October 1975) is an Ecuadorian former footballer who played as a midfielder. She has been a member of the Ecuador women's national team.

International career
Mercado capped for Ecuador at senior level during the 2006 South American Women's Football Championship.

References

External links

1975 births
Living people
Women's association football midfielders
Ecuadorian women's footballers
Sportspeople from Guayaquil
Ecuador women's international footballers
21st-century Ecuadorian women